St James Station is a former high country sheep and cattle station in the South Island of New Zealand. It is now referred to as the St James Conservation Area and is managed by the Department of Conservation.

The station was purchased for $40 million by the government in 2008 using funds from the Nature Heritage Fund, as well as from Land Information New Zealand. It had been owned by the Stevenson family since 1927. The government's purchase was a means of protection from intensive farming and development as well as guaranteeing public access.

The St James Walkway is a popular tramping track that passes through the area. The New Zealand Cycle Trail, announced by the Prime Minister as a boost for the economy, received funding for a St James Cycle Trail, which traverses part of the station.

See also
 Agriculture in New Zealand
 Protected areas of New Zealand

References

External links
St James Conservation Area at the Department of Conservation
St James Conservation Area – visitor brochure from the Department of Conservation

Geography of Canterbury, New Zealand
High Country stations
Protected areas of Canterbury, New Zealand
Cycleways in New Zealand